Gross-Titlis-Schanze (en: Large Titlis hill) is a ski jumping venue in Engelberg, Switzerland. It is named after the local mountain of Titlis. It is a regular venue in the FIS Ski jumping World Cup.

External links
http://www.weltcup-engelberg.ch

Ski jumping venues in Switzerland
Engelberg
Buildings and structures in Obwalden